Pir Syed Iftikhar Ul Hassan Shah (2 February 1942 – 2 August 2020), also known as Zahray Shah, was a Pakistani politician who was a member of the National Assembly of Pakistan, since August 2018. Previously he was a member of the National Assembly from June 2013 to May 2018.

Early life
He was born on 2 February 1942, in Sialkot, Punjab to Syed family and was a descendant of the Islamic saint Muhammad Channan Shah Nuri.

Political career
Shah was a member of the Pakistan Muslim League (N) (PML-N). He was a member of the Provincial Assembly of the Punjab in 1990. He was elected as a Member of the National Assembly of Pakistan for Daska in 1993 and again in 1998. Later, he was elected to the National Assembly of Pakistan as a candidate of the PML-N from Constituency NA-113 (Sialkot-IV) in 2013 Pakistani general election. He received 118,192 votes and defeated a candidate of Pakistan Tehreek-e-Insaf (PTI).

In October 2017, he was appointed as chairperson of the National Assembly's standing committees on postal services.

He was re-elected to the National Assembly as a candidate of PML-N from Constituency NA-75 (Sialkot-IV) in 2018 Pakistani general election. He received 101,617 votes and defeated Ali Asjad Malhi, a candidate of PTI.

Death
He died on 2 August 2020, at the age of 78.

References

1942 births
2020 deaths
Punjabi people
Pakistani MNAs 2013–2018
Politicians from Sialkot
Pakistani MNAs 2018–2023
Pakistan Muslim League (N) MPAs (Punjab)
Punjab MPAs 1990–1993
Pakistani MNAs 1993–1996
Pakistani MNAs 1997–1999
Punjab MPAs 1985–1988
Punjab MPAs 1988–1990